Carola Roloff (born 1959 in Holzminden, West Germany) is a German Buddhist nun.  Her monastic name is Bhiksuni Jampa Tsedroen.  An active teacher, translator, author, and speaker, she is instrumental in campaigning for equal rights for Buddhist nuns.

Early and religious life
Born in Holzminden, West Germany to a Protestant family, Roloff was active in her local Christian youth group.  When she was 18 years old, the suicide of a friend's family member caused Roloff to question God and life.  Doubting the source of suffering, Roloff recalls that she "couldn't get any satisfactory answers from Christian ministers."  As a result, she turned to the Buddhist philosophy and began her Buddhist studies and life in 1980, aged 21.  She travelled to Dharamshala, India in order to study Vajrayana Buddhism and the Tibetan language, before becoming a novice at the age of 22—one of the first Tibetan Buddhist nuns in Germany.  Her ordination as a novice was performed by Geshe Thubten Ngawang on 22 September 1981 at the Tibetan Centre Hamburg.  Geshe Thubten was also her spiritual teacher until his death in 2003. On 6 December 1985, Roloff received her full ordination into the Dharmaguptaka lineage at the Miao-tung monastery in Kaohsiung, Taiwan. She kept her novice name Jampa Tsedroen.  In Tibetan, Jampa means "maitrī" "loving kindness" (Pali: mettā) and "Tsedroen" means "lamp of life". While being ordained in the Dharmagupta tradition, Roloff is practising in the Tibetan Mulasarvastivada tradition.

Following her ordination, Roloff became active in translation, in the management of the Tibetan Centre in Hamburg, and in campaigning for equal opportunities for nuns.  As well as English and her native German, she is fluent in Tibetan, Sanskrit, and Pali.  With the help of her teacher Geshe Thubten, Roloff translated the sojong vows for bhiksunis into English, thereby greatly aiding Western Tibetan nuns in the ritual.  Further aiding the research and study of students around the world, Roloff helped digitise scripture and other Buddhist texts.  Roloff is also a Tibetologist and is working on her Ph.D. thesis at the University of Hamburg.  In keeping with Buddhist practices, she helps refugees at the Tibetan Centre Hamburg and guides and teaches Buddhist students.

A nun now for over two decades, Roloff's busy and hectic schedule leaves her little time to nurture her own spiritual life.  In an interview with Vasana Chinvarakorn of the Bangkok Post, she stated, "I feel I haven't practised enough. I've accumulated merits and increased a little bit of wisdom, but still my time for meditation and retreat is not enough."  Serving the community, however, is faithful to her bodhisattva vow and is Roloff's priority over her own personal development.

Female ordination in Buddhism
Ordaining female nuns, or bhiksunis, in the Tibetan tradition has been met with resistance from many Tibetan monks. Roloff is determined to change this reluctance to allow women into the tradition.  As well as campaigning for a change of opinion, she is instrumental in helping to determine how females can best be accommodated, both in the tradition itself and in sanghas (mutually supportive communities).  Fortunately for Roloff, this imposing challenge has been supported by the 14th Dalai Lama. At an international conference for Buddhist women in 1987, Roloff recalls him saying to her, "...'You women have to fight for it [bhikkhuni ordination]. You cannot expect the monks to serve it to you.'..." As well as lecturing and writing on the subject, Roloff conducts research with other monks and nuns to help strengthen their position.  The Vinaya scriptures, for example, show that the Buddha accepted the role of women as nuns in search of enlightenment, and Roloff therefore often quotes this text.

Management and advisory board activities
Since 1981, Roloff has served in several committees and has sat on the boards of directors of a few organisations.  Her current roles include being a member of the Committee of Western Bhikshunis, a member of the Bhikkhuni Ordination Committee for the Central Tibetan Administration, and she serves as an advisory board member at the Centre for Buddhist Studies, University of Hamburg.

Literary works
Roloff has written several papers, given numerous lectures, and has two published works.  Relevance of Vinaya in Modern Circumstances was published in 1991 and A Brief Survey of the Vinaya: Its Origin, Transmission, and Arrangement from the Tibetan Point of View with Comparisons to the Theravāda and Dharmagupta Traditions in 1992.

Recognition
In conjunction with the United Nation's International Women's Day, the International Congress for Buddhist Women presented Roloff with the Outstanding Women in Buddhism award, on 7 March 2007, at the United Nations centre in Bangkok.

See also
Therīgāthā
Ayya Khema
Sister Uppalavanna
Sister Vajirā
Women in Buddhism

Notes

External links

Jampa Tsedroen (website)
Post-Doc Researcher Akademie der Weltreligionen
Principal Investigator DFG Project on Buddhist Nuns
Faculty member Center for Buddhist Studies
Buddhist Teacher at Tibetisches Zentrum e.V.
Member of the Committee for Bhikshuni Ordination in the Tibetan Buddhist Tradition

1959 births
Living people
Former Protestants
German Buddhist nuns
German Buddhists
Former Christians
Converts to Buddhism from Christianity
Tibetan Buddhist nuns
Tibetan Buddhists from Germany
People from Holzminden
20th-century Buddhist nuns
21st-century Buddhist nuns